The 2009 Sunshine Tour was the tenth season of professional golf tournaments since the southern Africa based Sunshine Tour was relaunched in 2000, and the third since the tour switched a calendar based season in 2007. The Sunshine Tour represents the highest level of competition for male professional golfers in the region.

The tour was based predominantly in South Africa, with 26 of the 30 tournaments being held in the country. Two events were held in Swaziland, with one each in Zambia and Namibia.

As usual, the tour consisted of two distinct parts, commonly referred to as the "Summer Swing" and "Winter Swing". Tournaments held during the Summer Swing generally had much higher prize funds, attracted stronger fields, and were the only tournaments on the tour to carry world ranking points, with three events being co-sanctioned with the European Tour. Since the tour switched to a calendar based season, this part of the tour has been split in two, with six events being held at the start of the year, and the remainder in December.

The Winter Swing ran from April to early December, starting with the Vodacom Origins of Golf Tour, and closing with the Nedbank Affinity Cup.

The Order of Merit was won by Anders Hansen of Denmark.

Schedule
The following table lists official events during the 2009 season.

Order of Merit
The Order of Merit was based on prize money won during the season, calculated in South African rand.

Notes

References

External links

Sunshine Tour
Sunshine Tour